Craig F. Stowers (June 11, 1954 – February 10, 2022) was an American lawyer and jurist who served as an associate justice, and the 18th chief justice, of the Alaska Supreme Court. He was appointed by Governor Sean Parnell in 2009 as an associate justice to replace retiring Justice Robert Eastaugh. Stowers was one of seven candidates recommended to the Governor by the Alaska Judicial Council out of a record 25 applicants.

Stowers was born in Daytona Beach, Florida on June 11, 1954, and raised in Yorktown, Virginia. He earned his Bachelor of Science degree in biology from Blackburn College in 1975.  He then went on to serve as a park ranger with the National Park Service at Colonial National Historical Park in Virginia before transferring to Mount McKinley National Park in 1977. After leaving the National Park Service he earned his juris doctor in 1985 from the University of California, Davis School of Law, where he was inducted into the Order of the Coif honor society.  Stowers then served as a law clerk for U.S. Ninth Circuit Court of Appeals judge Robert Boochever and then went on to serve as a law clerk for Alaska Supreme Court Justice Warren Matthews.

In 1987, Stowers joined the law firm of Atkinson, Conway & Gagnon until leaving in 1995 to become a founding partner of the law firm of Clapp, Peterson and Stowers. In 2004, he left Clapp, Peterson and Stowers when he was appointed a Superior Court judge for the Third Judicial District in Anchorage by Governor Frank Murkowski.

Before his appointment to the Supreme Court by Governor Sean Parnell in 2009, Stowers was president of the board of directors of Christian Health Associates.  He is also a former board member of the Alaska Natural History Association, Brother Francis Shelter, and Anchorage Neighborhood Health Center. Stowers retired from the Supreme Court on June 1, 2020, and died on February 10, 2022, at the age of 67.

References

External links

|-

1954 births
2022 deaths
21st-century American judges
Alaska state court judges
Blackburn College (Illinois) alumni
Chief Justices of the Alaska Supreme Court
People from Daytona Beach, Florida
People from Yorktown, Virginia
Politicians from Anchorage, Alaska
UC Davis School of Law alumni
National Park Service personnel
Justices of the Alaska Supreme Court